Biddenden is a large, mostly agricultural and wooded village and civil parish in the borough of Ashford in Kent, England. It was a centre for the Wealden iron industry and also of clothmaking.

The parish includes the hamlet of Woolpack Corner.

Origin of Name
The place name of Biddenden is derived from the Kentish dialect of Old English, meaning "Bidda's woodland pasture". It is associated with a man called Bida, was originally Biddingden (c993) Bida + ing + denn, eventually evolving into the current spelling.

History

All Saints Biddenden is the parish church, built mostly in the 13th century. There was likely an earlier Saxon church here. During the half-century reign of Edward III, Flemish clothworkers were settled in the area. The ready availability of raw materials led to the establishment of a flourishing textile industry for the production of broadcloth. Wealth from this industry built many of the fine houses in town.

Biddenden Place was the ancestral home of the Mayney or Mayne family: the village school, originally founded in 1522, is named after its benefactor John Mayne.

Biddenden Maids
In 1100, Mary and Eliza Chulkhurst, a pair of conjoined twins, were supposedly born in the village. The origin of the perpetual charity of Biddenden is celebrated in the village signage of the Biddenden Maids, as they became known. The Biddenden Consolidated Charity provides Biddenden pensioners and widows with bread, cheese, and tea at Easter, a cash payment at Christmas, and distribution of Biddenden cakes.

Demography 

At the 2001 UK census, the Biddenden electoral ward had a population of 2,434. The ethnicity was 98.7% white, 0.4% mixed race, 0.3% Asian, 0.5% black and 0.1% other. The place of birth of residents was 94.2% United Kingdom, 0.4% Republic of Ireland, 1.6% other Western European countries, and 3.8% elsewhere. Religion was recorded as 78.6% Christian, 0.3% Buddhist, 0.2% Hindu, 0% Sikh, 0% Jewish, and 0.1% Muslim. 12.7% were recorded as having no religion, 0.3% had an alternative religion and 7.9% did not state their religion.

The economic activity of residents aged 16–74 was 32.8% in full-time employment, 12.5% in part-time employment, 16.9% self-employed, 1.7% unemployed, 1.1% students with jobs, 2.4% students without jobs, 18.8% retired, 9.4% looking after home or family, 2.5% permanently sick or disabled and 2% economically inactive for other reasons. The industry of employment of residents was 13.9% retail, 9.5% manufacturing, 10.3% construction, 14.3% real estate, 10.3% health and social work, 7.2% education, 4.7% transport and communications, 5.2% public administration, 4.9% hotels and restaurants, 5.7% finance, 5.8% agriculture and 8.2% other. Compared with national figures, the ward had a relatively high proportion of workers in agriculture and construction. There were a relatively low proportion in manufacturing, transport and communications. Of the ward's residents aged 16–74, 19.6% had a higher education qualification or the equivalent, compared with 19.9% nationwide.

An important cottage industry has developed to the west, where numerous vineyards and orchards produce varietal wines, ciders and juices. Biddenden is also the trading name of Biddenden's Cider. Biddenden's Cider is made by Biddenden Vineyards Ltd. whose premises are close to the clustered village centre.

Transport
Biddenden was served for nearly five decades by Biddenden railway station, on the Kent and East Sussex Railway. The station opened on 15 May 1905 and closed on 4 January 1954.

Bygone Buses was based in Biddenden during the late 1980s and early 1990s. It was sold to Maidstone & District Motor Services.

Notable people

Mary and Eliza Chulkhurst (1100–34), conjoined twins traditionally said to have lived in Biddenden.
Thomas Bickley (1518–96), was rector of Biddenden prior to 1585.
Elias Sydall (1672–1733), was rector of Biddenden 1702–05.
Edward Nares (1762–1841), theologian, was rector of Biddenden 1798–1827.
Robert Kahn (1865–1951), composer, lived in Biddenden from 1938–51.
John R. Winder (1821–1910), Second in command of the Church of Jesus Christ of Latter-day Saints 1901–1910, was born in Biddenden.
William Guy (1859–1950), pioneer of modern dentistry, was born in Biddenden.
King Rama VII of Siam (1893–1941) lived in Biddenden after his abdication in 1935.
Sir John Kotelawala (1895-1980), Prime Minister of Ceylon, lived in Biddenden for several years.

Notes and references
Notes
 

References

External links

 Official Site for Biddenden Parish Council

Villages in Kent
Villages in the Borough of Ashford
Civil parishes in Ashford, Kent